Zeta Phi Beta Sorority, Inc. is a historically African American sorority. In 1920, five women from Howard University envisioned a sorority that would raise the consciousness of their people, encourage the highest standards of scholastic achievement, and foster a greater sense of unity among its members. These women believed that sorority elitism and socializing overshadowed the real mission for progressive organizations. Since its founding Zeta Phi Beta has historically focused on addressing social causes.

Zeta Phi Beta is a non-profit 501(c)(7) organization that is divided into eight intercontinental regions and 800+ Chapters located in the US, Africa, Europe, Asia and the Caribbean. In 1948, Zeta Phi Beta became the first Greek-letter organization to charter a chapter in Africa (in Monrovia, Liberia).  Zeta Phi Beta is the third largest predominantly African-American sorority.

Zeta Phi Beta and Phi Beta Sigma are the only constitutionally bound sorority and fraternity in the National Pan-Hellenic Council (NPHC)

History

Beginnings
In the spring of 1919, during a stroll on the campus of Howard University, Charles Robert Samuel Taylor, member of Phi Beta Sigma Fraternity, shared with Arizona Cleaver his idea for a new sisterhood; a sister organization to his fraternity.  Arizona presented this idea to Pearl Anna Neal, Myrtle Tyler, Viola Tyler, and Fannie Pettie, and a new sisterhood was formed.

Arizona Cleaver sought permission from the Howard University administration to establish a new campus sorority.  That permission was granted, and on January 16, 1920, the first official meeting was held.  The five coeds chose the name Zeta Phi Beta.  Phi Beta was taken from Phi Beta Sigma to "seal and signify the relationship between the two organizations".

The newly established Zeta Phi Beta Sorority was given a formal introduction at Whitelaw Hotel by Phi Beta Sigma members Charles Robert Samuel Taylor and A. Langston Taylor.  The two Sigma brothers had been a source of advice and encouragement during the establishment of the sorority and throughout its early days.

Alpha Kappa Alpha and Delta Sigma Theta sororities held a "Welcome to Campus" reception in the assembly room in Miner Hall, in honor of the new sorority.

Later that year, in December 1920, the sorority held the first boule (convention) with members of Phi Beta Sigma at Howard University. The Archon, the sorority's official magazine was established shortly afterwards. Later Boules were held in many locations across the United States.

Zeta Phi Beta was first incorporated on March 30, 1923 in Washington, D.C. by sorority members Myrtle Tyler, Gladys Warrington, Joanna Houston, Josephine Johnson and O. Goldia Smith. The sorority was incorporated by the state of Illinois in 1939.

In 1923, the first chapter of any black sorority to organize a collegiate chapter in Texas, Theta chapter, was established at Wiley College.

In 1959, Zeta Phi Beta purchased its current headquarters, located at 1734 New Hampshire Avenue NW on Dupont Circle in Washington, DC.

The "Five Pearls" 
The Founders of Zeta Phi Beta were five collegiate students of Howard University. They are known to the members of the sorority as "The Five Pearls".

 Arizona Cleaver (Stemons): Arizona Cleaver was the first president of Alpha chapter and the first national president of Zeta Phi Beta Sorority. She completed her graduate and post-graduate studies in the field of social work and was responsible for chartering numerous undergraduate and graduate chapters throughout the United States.
 Myrtle Tyler (Faithful): Myrtle Tyler was the second national president of Zeta Phi Beta Sorority and blood sister to Viola Tyler. A high school mathematics and English teacher, Founder Tyler was an active member of Alpha Zeta chapter in Baltimore, Maryland.
 Viola Tyler (Goings): Viola Tyler graduated from Howard University with a teaching degree and a major in math. She taught school in Ohio for many years and was always very active in community affairs.
 Fannie Pettie (Watts): Fannie Pettie graduated from Howard with a Bachelor of Arts degree in education and taught junior and senior high schools in Savannah, Georgia. She was credited with organizing two additional Zeta chapters and had active membership in Delta Alpha Zeta chapter.
 Pearl Anna Neal: After graduating from Howard University's Conservatory of Music, Founder Neal continued her studies at the Juilliard School of Music. In 1938, she was the first black woman in New York to earn a master's degree in music from Columbia University. An extremely accomplished musician, Founder Neal taught music in North Carolina public schools and served as a director of seniors majoring in music at Teachers College in Winston-Salem, NC.

Firsts

Zeta Phi Beta was the first to charter a chapter in Africa (Monrovia, Liberia). Today, there are also chapters in U.S. Virgin Islands, Jamaica, Bahamas, Japan, Korea, Barbados, Haiti, Germany, Belgium, United Arab Emirates, Trinidad/Tobago  and most recently Accra, Ghana.
 Zeta Phi Beta was the first organization under the National Pan-Hellenic Council to have a national headquarters for all operations. Zeta Phi Beta is the first and only NPHC organization to be constitutionally bound to a fraternity, Phi Beta Sigma Fraternity, Incorporated. Zeta Phi Beta is the first sorority in the National Pan-Hellenic Council to organize an auxiliary group.

Activities
Held annually, Zeta Day on the Hill provides an opportunity for Zetas to exercise another level of civic responsibility by learning the protocols for interacting with and the knowledge needed to maximize engagement with congressional representatives.  As members of a "Community Conscious-Action Oriented" organization, Zetas schedule meetings with their representative or their representative's designee to discuss, during brief sessions, issues of interest to the local, state and national Zeta membership.

On January 25, 2001, Zeta Phi Beta was granted non-governmental organization (NGO) status with the United Nations.

In 2005, Zeta Phi Beta completed its $2 million renovation project of the international headquarters.  The historic building has served as Zeta's home since its purchase in 1959.

In December 2010 the sorority officially partnered with Stevie Wonder to collect toys for his annual House Full of Benefit Concert. All of the sorority's 850 chapters signed on to collect toys for the program.

Controversies

Following a February 5, 2006 news report by WJLA, a ABC affiliated TV station based in D.C., the U.S. Internal Revenue Service, Federal Bureau of Investigation and United States Attorney opened an investigation into alleged financial irregularities occurring with the sorority's National President Barbara C. Moore. Sorority member and National Executive Board member Natasha Stark was the whistleblower that notified WJLA of the president's wrongdoings.  Moore admitted to using sorority funds for personal expenses such as clothes, shoes, jewelry, food, liquor, etc. but disputed the figures reported by WJLA.  Despite her admission, the sorority's board of directors refused to remove her from office defying organization by-laws, attempted to suppress information reported by WJLA, and refused to fully cooperate with the FBI and IRS. The sorority's board of directors initially tried to resolve the matter privately by asking the president to sign a promissory note to repay over $300,000 of sorority funds used for personal expenses back to the sorority but that dissatisfied Stark. The purpose of the investigation was to determine if the president had obtained funds from the tax-exempt organization for personal gain which violated IRS codes. In retaliation for contacting WJLA, Stark was expelled for "violating her duty of loyalty to the sorority, engaging in conduct injurious to the sorority or its purposes, and unsisterly conduct." on March 20, 2007, Stark filed a lawsuit with the District of Columbia District Court requesting $1 million in damages. Stark's claims for breach of contract and negligence were dismissed at a September 11, 2008 status conference.

Entertainer Sheryl Underwood was elected as the 23rd International Grand Basileus (President), during the sorority's biennial business meeting in Las Vegas, Nevada in 2008. Her election as Grand Basileus was disputed by some members as illegitimate, but District of Columbia Superior Court Judge Gerald I. Fisher dismissed a lawsuit against the sorority and Underwood that asked the court to unseat Underwood.

On July 3, 2008, Lorrie Sinclair filed a Diversity-Breach of Contract suit in the District of Columbia District Court against Zeta Phi Beta demanding $76,000.

In August 2009, the sorority chapter at Colorado State University was expelled from the campus after disturbing police reports of hazing surfaced.

On August 12, 2010, Coastal Carolina University, located near Myrtle Beach, SC, suspended its chapter of Zeta Phi Beta sorority for five years after being found in violation of the university's hazing policy, according to a release from CCU. According to information gathered through an investigation by the CCU's Office of Student Conduct, the sorority violated the policy regarding new member processes, the release said. The terms of the suspension encompass all activities, including new member processes, meetings, community service and social events. After the suspension has expired, Zeta Phi Beta may petition CCU to recognize the sorority for the fall 2015 semester.

In 2011, the chapter at the University of Maryland - College Park was placed under heavy scrutiny when a former pledge reported to authorities the serious abuse she endured from members of the organization.  Seven members of the chapter were arrested for assault.  The University of Maryland - College Park, as with most U.S. institutions, had a zero tolerance hazing policy that was communicated to all active members of the university's Greek system.

In 2012, a student at the University of California at Berkeley sued the sorority after experiencing hazing so disturbing and humiliating that she dropped out of school.  She was initially reassured by members of the sorority that prospective members are not hazed, however she eventually learned that was a lie. In her lawsuit, she stated she had her head slammed into a wall, her pockets ripped from her jeans, she was beat over the head while being forced to recite the sorority's history, forced to clean up juice with only her back, and was subject to other illegal hazing activities.

In 2014, the sorority at the University of Memphis was given a three-year suspension for physically abusing and harassing pledges.  One known pledge's nose was broken after being repeatedly hit in the face by several Zetas.  Two Zetas identified in a police report as being extremely abusive towards pledges dropped out the university soon after the suspension was announced.

Official auxiliary organizations

Amicae

The Amicae group is composed of women who have not obtained a college degree, but wish to assist Zeta Phi Beta members in local activities. Currently there are over 175 Amicae groups in the U.S. The first Amicae group was organized in Omaha, Nebraska in 1947 by the Beta Psi Zeta chapter.

Archonettes
The Archonettes are composed of young high school-aged ladies (age 14 to 18) who demonstrate an interest in the goals and the ideals of scholarship, sisterly love, and community service.  Each Archonette group is affiliated with a local graduate chapter of Zeta Phi Beta.

Amicettes
The Amicettes are composed of girls age 9 to 13 who are willing to strive toward the high ideals of Zeta Phi Beta Sorority and who demonstrate potential for leadership in service to the community. . Each Amicettes group is affiliated with a local chapter of Zeta Phi Beta.

Pearlettes
The Pearlettes are composed of young girls age 4 to 8. Pearlettes are mentored by members of Zeta Phi Beta to become outstanding leaders in their communities.

Zeta Male Network
The Zeta Male Network is the title given to the support organization that includes males in the lives of members of Zeta Phi Beta.

National programs

National Educational Foundation

The National Educational Foundation of Zeta Phi Beta Sorority, Inc. is a 501(c)3 trust organization created in 1975 and operated by Zeta Phi Beta to oversee the sorority's charitable and educational activities. The trust awards scholarship grants, conducts community educational programs and activities, and engages in Foundation scholarship related research.

The Foundation partnered with Xavier University of New Orleans, The Consumer Health Foundation, the MidAtlantic Cancer Genetics Network, the Pennsylvania Legislative Black Caucus, and The Family Life Center of Shiloh Baptist Church and presented conferences on human genome research in Washington, D. C., Atlanta Georgia, New Orleans, Louisiana, Philadelphia, Pennsylvania, and Chicago, Illinois.

Stork's Nest
Since 1971, Zeta Phi Beta has enjoyed a partnership with the March of Dimes in an effort to encourage women to seek prenatal care within the first trimester of pregnancy, thereby increasing the prevention of birth defects and infant mortality. Known as the Stork's Nest Program, this collaboration encourages participation and healthy behaviors during the pregnancy through two components - incentives and education. Nationwide, Zeta Phi Beta sponsors over 175 Stork's Nests. In 1997, during the celebration of the 25th anniversary of collaboration with the March of Dimes, the program was updated to include a new national logo, new educational materials, and new incentive items for those mothers participating in the program. As of 2005, the Stork's Nest Program has served over 28,000 women.

Z-H.O.P.E.
The goal of Z-H.O.P.E. (Zetas Helping Other People Excel) is to positively impact the lives of people at all stages of the human life cycle. This is through doing hard work and community service.

Z-HOPE (Zetas Helping Other People Excel) is an international service initiative, introduced by the sorority's 22nd International Grand Basileus Barbara C. Moore.

Z-HOPE has six objectives. They are:
 To provide culturally appropriate informational activities according to the Z-HOPE program format
 To foster collaborative partnerships between community organizations with shared goals
 To promote the opportunities for expansion in Stork's Nest programs
 To facilitate community service and mentorship opportunities for members of the organization
 To provide an equitable chapter recognition program for community services rendered, and
 To provide a standard reporting format to concentrate efforts and demonstrate the organization's impact

To date, more than 750,000 individuals have participated in Z-HOPE related activities and programs.

Zeta Organizational Leadership Program (ZOL)
The Zeta Organizational Leadership Program is a leadership training certification program developed by Zeta Phi Beta Sorority. The overarching goal of the ZOL program is to provide members of Zeta Phi Beta with the essential leadership knowledge and skills.

The target audiences for ZOL includes, but are not limited to:
Members aspiring to be national elected officers
Members interested in being appointed regional and/or state directors
Local chapter officers—undergraduate and graduate
Elected regional and state officers
Advisors to undergraduate chapters
Sponsors and coordinators of Zeta Amicae Auxiliaries
Advisors to Youth Affiliates
Members aspiring to be leaders.

Partnerships
Phi Beta Sigma Fraternity, Inc
 U.S. Fish and Wildlife Service (Refuge System)
 American Association of Retired Persons (AARP)
 March of Dimes
 American Cancer Society
 St. Jude Children's Research Hospital
 Women Veterans Rock

Collaborations
National Academy of Elder Law Attorneys
The Estate and Long Term Care Planning, Inc.

Chapters

Notable members

See also
List of social fraternities and sororities
List of African-American Greek and fraternal organizations
Arizona Cleaver Stemons

References

External links

Official web site

 
International student societies
National Pan-Hellenic Council
Student organizations established in 1920
Student societies in the United States
1920 establishments in Washington, D.C.